Moran House may refer to:

Places
in Australia
Moran House, a facility at St. Augustine's College (New South Wales), Brookvale, New South Wales

in England
House of Baron Moran, of Manton in the County of Wiltshire

in the United States (by state)
 Moran Place, Dresden, Tennessee. Ornate Victorian gingerbread house from a design by famed architect George Franklin Barber. John W. Moran commissioned the building in 1895 for his wife Sophia Riley Gunn Moran.  She died before construction was completed.
Ben Moran House, Moranburg, Kentucky, National Register of Historic Places listings in Mason County, Kentucky
Thomas Moran House, East Hampton, New York, NRHP-listed home of painter Thomas Moran
Knight-Moran House, near Franklin, Tennessee, NRHP-listed
Moran-Moore House, Wharton, Texas, listed on the NRHP in Wharton County, Texas
Moran Building, 501-509 G St., NW, Washington, D.C., listed on the NRHP in Washington, D.C.
Moran House (Washington, D.C.), 2315 Massachusetts Ave., NW, Washington, D.C., built 1908, now Embassy of Pakistan, designed by George Oakley Totten, Jr.
Moran's Saloon, Beloit, Wisconsin, listed on the NRHP in Rock County, Wisconsin
Moran Bay Patrol Cabin, Moose, Wyoming, NRHP-listed

Businesses
Mycroft & Moran, an imprint of Arkham House publisher
John Moran Auctioneers, a Southern California-based auction house and appraisal company